Annsert Sylvester Whyte (born 10 April 1987) is a Jamaican athlete competing in the 400 metres hurdles. He represented his country at the 2013 and 2015 World Championships reaching the semifinals on both occasions. His personal best in the event is 48.07 seconds set at the 2016 Summer Olympics in the final of the event.

Competition record

References

External links
 

1987 births
Living people
Sportspeople from Kingston, Jamaica
Jamaican male hurdlers
World Athletics Championships athletes for Jamaica
Place of birth missing (living people)
Athletes (track and field) at the 2014 Commonwealth Games
Athletes (track and field) at the 2016 Summer Olympics
Olympic athletes of Jamaica
Central American and Caribbean Games silver medalists for Jamaica
Competitors at the 2018 Central American and Caribbean Games
Jamaican Athletics Championships winners
Central American and Caribbean Games medalists in athletics
Commonwealth Games competitors for Jamaica